Griffin McDorman Yow (born September 25, 2002) is an American professional soccer player who plays as a winger for Belgian First Division A club Westerlo.

Professional
Yow scored his first professional goal against Memphis 901 FC for Loudoun United FC on March 16, 2019. 

On March 19, 2019, he became the 12th homegrown player to be signed with D.C. United.
Yow made his professional debut with D.C. United in the 90th minute replacing Paul Arriola against New York City FC on April 21, 2019. Yow scored his first non-competitive goal for D.C. United in a friendly against Real Betis on May 22, 2019. Yow made his first start with D.C. United on July 4, 2019 against FC Dallas, playing 58 minutes in a 0–2 loss. On September 19, 2020, Yow scored his first Major League Soccer goal against Toronto FC, equalizing the game 2–2.

On July 4, 2022, Yow was sold by D.C. United to recently promoted Westerlo.

International
Yow has appeared for the United States under-17 team, scoring his first goal against Brazil's U-17 football team in a friendly tournament. In October 2019, he was named to the squad for the 2019 FIFA U-17 World Cup in Brazil.

Career statistics

Club

References

External links

2002 births
Living people
American expatriate sportspeople in Belgium
American expatriate soccer players
American soccer players
United States men's youth international soccer players
Association football forwards
D.C. United players
K.V.C. Westerlo players
Expatriate footballers in Belgium
Homegrown Players (MLS)
Loudoun United FC players
Belgian Pro League players
Major League Soccer players
People from Clifton, Virginia
Soccer players from Virginia
Sportspeople from Fairfax County, Virginia
USL Championship players